The Landesliga Mittelrhein is the second highest amateur football league in the region of Middle Rhine which is part of the state of North Rhine-Westphalia and since 2012 the sixth tier of the German football league system. It operates in two groups which run parallel below the Oberliga Mittelrhein. Until the introduction of the 3. Liga in 2008 it was the sixth tier of the league system; until the introduction of the Regionalligas in 1994 the fifth tier.

History
The league was founded in 1946 as the Rheinbezirksliga (Rhine District League), the highest division for the area covered by the Middle Rhine football association. A year later another division was added. In 1949 it became a second tier to the 2. Oberliga West. In 1956 it was demoted to the third tier after Verbandsliga Mittelrhein was founded. The league still remained as feeder to the Verbandsliga with the replacement of the 2. Oberliga West by the old Regionalliga West in 1963. In turn the Regionalliga was replaced by 2. Bundesliga Nord in 1974. In 1978 it was slipped to the fourth tier under the Oberliga Nordrhein, in 1994 it was the fifth under the current Regionalliga West, and in 2008 it was the sixth under the NRW-Liga which took over after Oberliga was abolished.

In the German football league system, the Landesliga was first established as second-rate below the Oberliga West and was later slipped five times down to the seventh level by the introduction of the aforementioned higher leagues. Since the league structural reform of 2012 and the related dissolution of the NRW-Liga in favor of the Oberliga Mittelrhein, however, the league moved up from the seventh to the sixth level.

Modus
The Landesliga Mittelrhein consists of eastern and western groups of 16 clubs each. The exact number of teams is carried out every year on a geographical basis.

The champions of each group are promoted to the Oberliga Mittelrhein, provided they are not reserve teams of senior clubs or are financially sound. Should a winner or both winners be deemed ineligible or refuse promotion, the next best-placed teams in their groups will be promoted. The number of promotions to the Oberliga depend on the number of relegations and promotions in that league. Teams ranked 13th (or 14th) and below are relegated to their respective Bezirksliga and are replaced by the champions and runners-up from each Bezirksliga. A reserve team is also relegated if its senior team drops down to the Landesliga.

League champions

The top two in the inaugural season:

The league champions of the two divisions since 1948:

Note: No teams were promoted from 1951 to 1955.

References

External links
Official website of the Middle Rhine Football Association

Landesliga
Football competitions in North Rhine-Westphalia
Sports leagues established in 1946
1946 establishments in Germany